Parliamentary elections were held in Austria on 10 May 1959. Although the Socialist Party received the most votes, the Austrian People's Party retained a bare one-seat plurality. The Communist Party of Austria lost its remaining three seats and has not returned to the National Council since. Voter turnout was 94%.  The grand coalition that had governed the country since 1945 remained in office, with People's Party leader Julius Raab as Chancellor and Socialist leader Bruno Pittermann as Vice-Chancellor.

Results

References

Elections in Austria
Austria
Legislative
Austria